Andreas Reigber is an electrical engineer from the German Aerospace Center (DLR) in Wessling, Germany. He was named a Fellow of the Institute of Electrical and Electronics Engineers (IEEE) in 2016. for his contributions to SAR tomography and airborne multi-band SAR.

References

External links

20th-century births
Living people
Engineers from Baden-Württemberg
Fellow Members of the IEEE
Year of birth missing (living people)
Place of birth missing (living people)
People from Starnberg (district)